The 2011–12 season of SC Freiburg is the club's 14th season in the Bundesliga, the highest division in German football, and the third consecutive season since promotion in 2009. It is the club's first season with Marcus Sorg as manager. The season began on 20 June with their first training session.

Off-season 
Beg Ferati from Basel became the first official signing of Freiburg's 2011–12 season upon confirmation on 7 March 2011. Further signings were 1. FC Nürnberg goalkeeper Daniel Batz and forward Garra Dembélé from Levski Sofia. Also Ivica Banović returned from his loan spell at MSV Duisburg, whilst Christian Bickel and Simon Brandstetter joined from the club's own reserve squad. Furthermore, Freiburg began the season with a new manager, Marcus Sorg, after the previous manager Robin Dutt moved to Bayer Leverkusen. Sorg had been in charge of the club's reserves team.

Summer transfers

In:

Out:

Mid-season transfers

In:

Out:

Competitions

Bundesliga

League table

Matches

DFB-Pokal

Freiburg's DFB-Pokal campaign ended up as a disappointment after being eliminated in the first round by third division side Unterhaching.

Players

Kits

References

External links
SC Freiburg's Official Site (German)

SC Freiburg seasons
German football clubs 2011–12 season